Philip Gray (born 2 October 1968) is a Northern Irish former professional footballer. A striker, Gray won 26 caps for his country and played for ten professional clubs, his transfer fees totalling £1,475,000. Northern Ireland won every game Phil scored in.

Biography
Born in Belfast, Gray began his career as an apprentice at Tottenham Hotspur, signing a professional contract in 1986. After nine appearances in four years, he was loaned out to Barnsley during the 1989–90 season and Fulham in the 1990–91 season. Tottenham won the FA Cup in 1990–91 and Gray contributed one appearance during the cup run against Portsmouth. In August 1991 Luton Town bought Gray for £275,000. After scoring 22 goals in 59 games, Sunderland signed Gray for £800,000 in July 1993.

In May 1996 he was released by Sunderland. He signed for Dutch club Fortuna Sittard in August. After a season in the Netherlands, he returned to Luton in September 1997 for a fee of £400,000. In July 2000 he was released and signed for Burnley. He moved on to Oxford United in November that year. In 2001, he was loaned out to Boston United. Released by Oxford in July 2002

International goals
Scores and results list Northern Ireland's goal tally first.

References

1968 births
Association footballers from Belfast
Association footballers from Northern Ireland
Tottenham Hotspur F.C. players
Barnsley F.C. players
Fulham F.C. players
Luton Town F.C. players
Sunderland A.F.C. players
Fortuna Sittard players
Burnley F.C. players
Oxford United F.C. players
Boston United F.C. players
Chelmsford City F.C. players
Stevenage F.C. players
Maidenhead United F.C. players
Stotfold F.C. players
Living people
Northern Ireland international footballers
Association football forwards